In Dvaita theology, Nitya-samsarins, as classified by Shri Madhvacharya, are souls which are eternally transmigrating.

Madhva divides souls into three classes: one class of souls which qualifies for liberation (Mukti-yogyas), another as subject to eternal rebirth or eternal transmigration (Nitya-samsarins), and a third class that is eventually condemned to eternal hell Andhatamisra (Tamo-yogyas).

Nitya-samsarins delight only in worldly values and feel no need for ethical and spiritual life. By reaping the fruits of their own actions, they pass through continuous births and deaths eternally.

References 

Dvaita Vedanta
Hindu philosophical concepts